Oļegs Blagonadeždins (born 16 May 1973) is a Latvian former professional footballer who played as a defender.

Career
Blagonadeždins was born in Donetsk, Soviet Union. During his playing career he played 70 international matches and scored two goals for the Latvia national team. He debuted in 1992 when the national team was founded, and played at the Euro 2004. He started his career in Pārdaugava, then played for Skonto FC for several years. Blagonadeždins also played for Spartak-Alania Vladikavkaz in Russia. His last club was FK Jūrmala.

From February to July 2012 Blagonadeždins managed the Latvian Higher League club Spartaks Jūrmala. Prior to the 2014 Latvian First League season Blagonadeždins was appointed as the manager of AFA Olaine. In mid-season he left, joining his previous club Spartaks Jūrmala to fulfill the role of the assistant manager. For a short period of time in June 2014 Blagonadeždins worked as the care-taker at the club, fulfilling the manager's functions from the dismissal of Fabio Micarelli till appointment of Roman Pylypchuk.

Honours
Skonto Riga
 Baltic Cup: 1993, 2001
 Latvian champion (7): 1992, 1993, 1994, 1995, 1997, 1998, 1999

External links
Latvian Football Federation (in Latvian)

1973 births
Living people
Latvian people of Ukrainian descent
Footballers from Donetsk
Latvian footballers
Association football defenders
Latvia international footballers
Latvian Higher League players
Russian Premier League players
UEFA Euro 2004 players
Skonto FC players
FC Spartak Vladikavkaz players
Latvian expatriate footballers
Latvian expatriate sportspeople in Russia
Expatriate footballers in Russia